Uglerodovsky is an urban locality (an urban-type settlement) in Krasnosulinsky District of Rostov Oblast, Russia. Population:

References

Urban-type settlements in Rostov Oblast